Hoşhaber is a belde (town) in the central district (Iğdır) of Iğdır Province, Turkey. The population of Hoshaber is 2692  as of 2011. The settlement was  captured by the Russian Empire from Persia, but it was ceded to Turkey after the First World War. In 1998 the settlement was declared a seat of township.

References

Populated places in Iğdır Province
Towns in Turkey
Iğdır Central District
Kurdish settlements in Turkey

Former Armenian inhabited settlements